Oliver Edwards (December 2, 1871 – February 25, 1921) was a United States Army officer in the late 19th and early 20th centuries. He served in several conflicts, including the Spanish–American War and World War I, and he received the Distinguished Service Medal for his efforts in the latter conflict.

Biography

Edwards was born in Chesterfield, Massachusetts, on December 2, 1871. He graduated from the United States Military Academy in 1894 and was commissioned into the 11th Infantry Regiment.

After serving in the 11th Infantry, Edwards served, in succeeding order, in the 6th, 28th, 23rd, and 5th Infantry Regiments. Edwards served in the Puerto Rican Campaign during the Spanish–American War. After serving as am aide to Jacob H. Smith during the Philippine–American War, he participated in the Second Occupation of Cuba between 1906 and 1909. Edwards became a distinguished graduate of the Army School of the Line in 1910, and he graduated from the Army Staff College the following year. After serving as an instructor for the college, Edwards left in 1912 to teach a course for the French Army. After returning, he served in Panama as an intelligence officer and chief of staff.

Edwards was promoted to the rank of brigadier general on August 8, 1918. He went to France because of World War I and organized and commanded the Machine Gun Training Center, receiving the Army Distinguished Service Medal for his work. The model's citation reads as follows:

With the war over, and after returning to the U.S., Edwards reverted to his permanent rank of colonel and became a student at the General Staff College. He also worked in the intelligence division of the United States Department of War's general staff. Edwards died of illness on February 25, 1921, while on assignment.

References

Bibliography

1871 births
1921 deaths
People from Chesterfield, Massachusetts
American military personnel of the Spanish–American War
United States Army generals of World War I
United States Army generals
Recipients of the Distinguished Service Medal (US Army)
United States Military Academy alumni
United States Army Command and General Staff College alumni
Military personnel from Massachusetts